Topsham Air Force Station  is a closed United States Air Force station. It was closed in 1969.

History
Topsham AFS was initially the headquarters of the Air Defense Command Bangor Air Defense Sector (BaADS), which was activated on 8 January 1957.

In 1958 a Semi Automatic Ground Environment (SAGE) Data Center (DC-05) was established at Topsham AFS.  The SAGE system was a network linking Air Force (and later FAA) General Surveillance Radar stations into a centralized center for Air Defense, intended to provide early warning and response for a Soviet nuclear attack.  A GATR site (R-25) was also constructed at Topsham  as part of the 654th Radar Squadron at Brunswick AFS, but was reassigned to the BaADS at Topsham AFS when the 654th RADS was inactivated in 1965.

The BaADS was absorbed by the 36th Air Division,  being moved to Topsham from Davis Monthan AFB, Arizona on 1 April 1966.  DC-02 with its AN/FSQ-7 computer remained under the 34th AD until it, and the Air Division was inactivated on 30 September 1969 when technology advances allowed the Air Force to shut down many SAGE Data Centers.

With the inactivation of the 36th AD, the station and GATR site were closed.   The former Topsham AFS is now an annex of the now-closed Naval Air Station Brunswick. The SAGE DC blockhouse was demolished in August 1985 and is now a recreation field.

Known ADCOM units assigned
 36th Air Division, 1 April 1966 – 30 September 1969
 Bangor Air Defense Sector, 8 January 1957 – 1 April 1966

See also
 List of USAF Aerospace Defense Command General Surveillance Radar Stations

References

  A Handbook of Aerospace Defense Organization 1946 - 1980,  by Lloyd H. Cornett and Mildred W. Johnson, Office of History, Aerospace Defense Center, Peterson Air Force Base, Colorado
 Winkler, David F. (1997), Searching the skies: the legacy of the United States Cold War defense radar program. Prepared for United States Air Force Headquarters Air Combat Command.
 Information for Topsham AFS, ME

External links

Installations of the United States Air Force in Maine
Semi-Automatic Ground Environment sites
Aerospace Defense Command military installations
Military installations closed in 1969
Buildings and structures in Topsham, Maine
1957 establishments in Maine
1969 disestablishments in Maine
Military installations established in 1957